Vexillum consanguineum, common name the kindred mitre, is a species of sea snail, a marine gastropod mollusk, in the family Costellariidae, the ribbed miters.

Description
The length of the shell attains 14.5 mm.

(Original description) The shell is ovate, rather solid and stout. It is contracted towards the base. The  spire is obtusely rounded. The shell is transversely very finely striated with punctures, longitudinally closely plicate!y ribbed. The ribs are granose at thn lower part. The shell is dark red. The  whorls are encircled round the middle with a row of small round white spots . The columella is four-plaited.

Distribution
This marine species occurs off the Philippines.

References

External links
 W.O.Cernohorsky, The Mitridae of Fiji - The Veliger v. 8 (1965-1966)

consanguineum
Gastropods described in 1845